Lokutu Airport  is an airport serving the town of Lokutu in Tshopo Province, Democratic Republic of the Congo.

See also

 Transport in the Democratic Republic of the Congo
 List of airports in the Democratic Republic of the Congo

References

External links
 FallingRain - Lokutu Airport
 HERE Maps - Lokutu
 OpenStreetMap - Lokutu
 OurAirports - Lokutu
 

Airports in Tshopo